is a Japanese manga series written and illustrated by Nyoijizai. It was serialized in Houbunsha's Manga Time Kirara Forward issues from October 2015 to November 2020. The manga has been licensed by Seven Seas Entertainment in North America, with the first two volumes released in July and October 2018 respectively. An anime television series adaptation by C2C aired from July 6 to September 21, 2018.

Plot
In Okinawa, high school city girl Haruka Ozora has an extreme complex about her tall height comparison, while her cousin Kanata Higa (an Okinawan native) is very self-conscious about her short height and flat chest. She also begins to have second thoughts about quitting volleyball all together. However, with help from their experiences, the two girls decide to form a volleyball club at their school.

Characters

Umuru High Beach Volleyball Club
Originally, the club consisted of the Thomas Twins, Emily and Claire; only being recognized as an extension of Urumu High School's Indoor Volleyball Club; much to Claire's annoyance due to her sister's by-the-book demeanor; meaning the club could not be its own official club until the club gets a minimum of five members. After witnessing Haruka and Kanata's rematch with Narumi and Ayasa, they are inspired to recruit them to the club; with Haruka being excited to join, while Kanata being apprehensive about accepting. After a local Junior tournament, Akari is inspired to join the club and after being challenged by Kanata, the sport inspires her to join the club, thus being the fifth member to make the club official. Despite not having a partner, Akari's demeanor inspires Kanata to nominate her as the club's Manager. After a talk with Claire, Claire and Emily's mother, Marissa, joins the club as the team's coach during her offseason. Unofficially, Haruka and Kanata's grandmother acts as the team's mascot.

Team Harukana
The pairing of maternal cousins, Haruka Ozora and Kanata Higa. Kanata was originally partnered with Narumi and hoped to become National Champions as a team. But, due to her parents' death; their team disbanded with Narumi reteaming with Ayase Tachibana, and Kanata leaving the sport. As for Haruka, she is still technically a rookie to the sport, but has a natural talent for picking up the game.

 Kanata's first cousin through her mother's side. She comes to Okinawa because of her parents' employment, and although initially Kanata is distant from her, they quickly become friends thanks to beach volleyball. Haruka is a rather light-headed and open person, so she often emotionally reacts to people and events around her. She also tends to admire Kanata and from time to time give her ambiguous compliments, but this trait was removed in the anime.

Kanata is Haruka's first cousin, through her mother, and partner in beach volleyball. She got into beach volleyball through her mother's motivation and wanting to befriend Narumi. Although she is already an experienced volleyball player, several years ago she was forced to leave this sport because of her parents' death and psychological trauma. Kanata is a rather shy, quiet and reserved girl, but in unusual situations she can behave eccentrically. Like Narumi, she is in a long depression because of the breakdown of their volleyball pair, which is why Ayasa and later Haruka compare them to the ex-girlfriends. Nevertheless, in the future, she regains confidence in her abilities thanks to her ever-strengthening bond with Haruka. She is a believer in "No Such Thing as Aces", as she believes that it takes a team to win rather than playing alone; a belief that was passed to her former partner, Narumi.

Team Eclair
The pairing of the Thomas Twins, Claire and Emily; who are daughters of Marissa Thomas, a former US Pro Player and current coach. Their team name is a play on éclair. They are ranked as the second best pairing behind Narumi and Ayasa. Originally, when Kanata and Narumi were a team, the pair was defeated by them, with Claire declaring them their rivals (and friends); eventually, their mother became Narumi and Ayasa's coach, with the Thomas Family becoming close with Kanata's family. However, when Kanata's parents died, they noted Kanata's broken spirit as the twins noticed this was not the fiery Kanata that defeated them prior. Marissa offers herself as Kanata's parental figure upon learning Kanata's return to the sport.

An American exchange student at Urama High School who, along with her twin sister Emily, is one of the top junior beach volleyball players in the world. Claire combines the personality traits of Haruka and Ayasa, demonstrates the carelessness and cheerfulness of the first, and the playful teasing of the second. She quickly becomes close with Haruka because of the similarity of their personalities and they can often be seen together if Kanata is not around.

 The younger Claire's twin-sister and her beach volleyball partner. She is also the club's leader and part of the Student Body Council. Although they often argue with each other and Emily regularly sarcastically comments on her childish antics, they still remain a good pair and Emily refuses to play with anyone other than Claire.

Fukuchiyama Academy
Located in the Kyoto Area, the school is known for having a strong volleyball program for both indoor and beach style. The most notable members of that group is the academy's "Valkyries", Narumi Tōi and Ayasa Tachibana.

 Phlegmatic and serious, she is Kanata's former partner on volleyball. Although earlier they became friends and shared a strong bond thanks to beach volleyball, at the moment they are in a rather strained relationship and do not play together anymore; still feeling guilty about not being there for Kanata when she needed her the most. She adopts the "No Such Thing As Aces" philosophy from Kanata. At the same time, she continues to worry about Kanata and is sincerely pleased when she finds Haruka as a new partner; keeping in contact with Emily and Akari to report their status. Together with Ayasa, Narumi is a multiple champion of local competitions in beach volleyball and even got along with her the title of "idols" of this sport.

Narumi's best friend and partner. She is the first person with whom Haruka befriended in Okinawa besides her cousin. Although Ayasa is quite a friendly person, she is strongly emotionally attached to Narumi and even compares to her jealous girlfriend when she uses a romantic metaphor for their partnership in volleyball. Originally, she was an indoor volleyball player on a scholarship; but after challenging Narumi, she is inspired to transition from indoor volleyball to beach volleyball, eventually becoming Narumi's partner. Her relationship with Haruka is almost similar to how Claire treats Emily. She also advises Kanata to be too dependent on Haruka.

Other members

 Nicknamed "Shii-Chan" by Haruka and Claire, much to her embarrassment, Akari is a new girl who originally wanted to play beach volleyball to become popular as an idol after being inspired by Narumi and Ayasa's photo magazine, but eventually decides to become a beach volleyball club manager. Akari is a tsundere, so she is constantly embarrassed and nervous when other girls call her their friend or when Claire remember her participation in the drink's advertising in the past as the Shequasar Girl. Being more of a rookie than Haruka, she still trains with the team in drills. Her strength in Beach Volleyball is her high endurance and stamina despite being a rookie, which she attributes to her stint as an idol. She is the one who gives a hibiscus scrunchy to each of the club members, which symbolizes their friendship despite fellow club members will face off against each other in competition.

 Claire and Emily's mother, and Kanata and Narumi's former coach. She is a former American beach volleyball player and current coach in the Pro Circuit in the states; but during the off season, she decides to become the Club's Coach at Claire's request, Kanata's return to the sport, and a special interest in Haruka. She surprises Haruka, as she is much taller and stronger. Akari comes to admire her due to her perfect body. She also calls Akari, "Shii-Chan", but shows frustration towards Claire for telling her that. She becomes a parental figure towards Kanata even more after finding out she returned to the sport.

Other competitors

Other characters

Haruka and Kanata's grandmother. She and her husband adopted Kanata, after her parents' died. She then takes in Haruka when her parents have to leave due to work. She is supportive of both her granddaughters and acts as a mascot of sorts for their club.

Grandpa Higa
Haruka and Kanata's grandfather, and Sora's husband. His face is unseen the entire time. He tends to be absent minded as Sora has to continue to look for him. His hobby is fishing.

Kanata's pet turtle, who seems to be shy around Haruka as he hides when she tries to pet him. There is an implication that he somewhat might be smarter than Haruka.

Haruka's mother and Kanata's aunt.

Media

Manga
Harukana Receive is a manga series written and illustrated by Nyoijizai. It began serialization in Houbunsha's Manga Time Kirara Forward with the October 2015 issue, and it ended in the November 2020 issue on September 24, 2020. The chapters were collected and released in the tankōbon format by Houbunsha. As of October 12, 2020, ten volumes have been released. Seven Seas Entertainment have licensed the manga for a North American release.

Anime
An anime television series adaptation by C2C aired from July 6 to September 21, 2018, on AT-X and other channels. The series was directed by Toshiyuki Kubooka, with series composition by Touko Machida and character designs by Takeshi Oda. The opening theme is "FLY two BLUE" by Kana Yūki and Saki Miyashita, while the ending theme is "Wish me luck!!!" by Yūki, Miyashita, Atsumi Tanezaki, and Rie Suegara. Crunchyroll simulcast the series with English subtitles, while Funimation streamed an English dub. Following Sony's acquisition of Crunchyroll, the dub was moved to Crunchyroll. The series ran for 12 episodes.

Video game
Characters from the series appear alongside other Manga Time Kirara characters in the 2018 mobile RPG, Kirara Fantasia.

Reception
Lauren Orsini from Anime News Network describes the greatest strength in Harukana Receive to be sharing "the story of that joy, skimming over anything that wasn't important" and highlighting that, in spite of the emotional intensity in some of the beach volleyball matches, messages of friendship and enthusiasm are strongly at the forefront in the anime, even if the stakes might not be as high as those of other series in the season. Orsini further characterizes Harukana Receive as being a solid summer anime, with a relaxing, warm story about beach volleyball and players who are passionate about the sport. Stig Høgset, writing for THEM Anime Reviews, praised the series for providing "dynamic fanservice" that showcase the cast's natural athletic build during the volleyball scenes that display "pretty nice animation work" through various maneuvers, calling it, "A fun, energetic sports show with lots of sportsmanship to spare."

Notes

References

External links

Harukana Receive @ Seven Seas Entertainment

2015 manga
Anime series based on manga
Beach volleyball
AT-X (TV network) original programming
C2C (studio)
Crunchyroll anime
Houbunsha manga
School life in anime and manga
Seinen manga
Seven Seas Entertainment titles
Television shows set in Okinawa Prefecture
Volleyball in anime and manga